Yinka Kudaisi  (born 25 August 1975) is a Nigerian former football defender who played for the Nigeria women's national football team at the 2004 Summer Olympics. At the club level, she played for Pelican Stars.

See also
 Nigeria at the 2004 Summer Olympics

References

External links
 
 

1975 births
Living people
Nigerian women's footballers
Place of birth missing (living people)
Footballers at the 2000 Summer Olympics
Footballers at the 2004 Summer Olympics
Olympic footballers of Nigeria
Women's association football defenders
1995 FIFA Women's World Cup players
Nigeria women's international footballers
1999 FIFA Women's World Cup players
2007 FIFA Women's World Cup players
Damallsvenskan players
QBIK players
Pelican Stars F.C. players